
Gmina Brzeźnio is a rural gmina (administrative district) in Sieradz County, Łódź Voivodeship, in central Poland.

Villages
Gmina Brzeźnio contains the villages and settlements of Barczew, Borowiska, Bronisławów, Brzeźnio, Dębołęka, Gęsina, Gozdy, Kliczków Mały, Kliczków Wielki, Kliczków-Kolonia, Krzaki, Lipno, Nowa Wieś, Ostrów, Podcabaje, Próba, Pustelnik, Pyszków, Rembów, Ruszków, Rybnik, Rydzew, Stefanów Barczewski Drugi, Stefanów Barczewski Pierwszy, Stefanów Ruszkowski, Wierzbowa, Wola Brzeźniowska, Zapole and Złotowizna.

Neighbouring gminas
Gmina Brzeźnio is bordered by the gminas of Brąszewice, Burzenin, Sieradz, Wróblew and Złoczew.

References
Polish official population figures 2006

Brzeznio
Sieradz County